The Colonial Athletic Association (CAA) is a collegiate athletic conference affiliated with the NCAA's Division I whose full members are located in East Coast states from Massachusetts to South Carolina. Most of its members are public universities, and the conference is headquartered in Richmond. The CAA was historically a Southern conference until the addition of four schools in the Northeast (of five that joined from rival conference America East) after the turn of the 21st century, which added geographic balance to the conference.

The CAA was founded in 1979 as the ECAC South basketball league. It was renamed the Colonial Athletic Association in 1985 when it added championships in other sports (although a number of members maintain ECAC affiliation in some sports).  As of 2006, it organizes championships in 21 men's and women's sports.  The addition of Northeastern University in 2005 gave the conference the NCAA minimum of six football programs needed to sponsor football. For the 2007 football season, all of the Atlantic 10 Conference's football programs joined the CAA football conference, as agreed in May 2005. The football league operates under CAA administration as the technically separate entity of CAA Football.

The conference most recently added Hampton University, Monmouth University, North Carolina A&T State University, and Stony Brook University in 2022. Stony Brook, already a member of CAA Football, joined in other sports at that time; Hampton and Monmouth joined both the all-sports CAA and CAA Football; and NC A&T joined the all-sports CAA in 2022 and will join CAA Football in 2023. The CAA has since announced that Campbell University will join both sides of the league in 2023.

History

The CAA has expanded in recent years, following the exits of longtime members such as the United States Naval Academy, the University of Richmond, East Carolina University, and American University. In 2001, the six-member conference added four additional universities: Towson University, Drexel University, Hofstra University, and the University of Delaware. Four years later the league expanded again when Georgia State University and Northeastern University joined, further enlarging the conference footprint. Virginia Commonwealth University (VCU) left for the Atlantic 10 Conference in July 2012. More changes came in 2013: Old Dominion University left for Conference USA, Georgia State joined the Sun Belt Conference, and the College of Charleston joined the CAA from the Southern Conference.

On the playing field, the CAA has produced 16 national team champions in six different sports (the most recent being the James Madison University Dukes who won the 2018 Division I Women's Lacrosse championship), 33 individual national champions, 11 national coaches of the year, 11 national players of the year and 12 Honda Award winners. In 2006, George Mason became the first CAA team to reach the Final Four. In 2011, the VCU Rams became the second CAA team to reach the Final Four, as well as the first team to win five games en route, due to their participation in the First Four round.

On March 25, 2013, George Mason University left the CAA to join the Atlantic 10 Conference. Shortly after, the CAA ceased sponsorship of wrestling due to the lack of teams.

The 2015–16 basketball season saw the conference RPI reach its highest rating when it finished the season ranked 9th in the nation.

During another phase of realignment that started in 2021, the CAA was affected when longtime member James Madison University announced it would leave the CAA, transition its football program to the Football Bowl Subdivision, and join the Sun Belt Conference (SBC). Initially, JMU was to join the SBC in July 2023. However, the timeline changed when the CAA chose to ban JMU from subsequent championship events, citing a conference bylaw that allows it to impose such a ban on a departing member. Thus, JMU officially joined the Sun Belt in July 2022 instead (at which time it was counted as an FBS member for scheduling purposes after meeting an NCAA minimum requirement of five FBS opponents at home), housing all of its sports in that league, including men's soccer, which would be sponsored by the SBC again, but one season earlier.

Shortly before JMU announced its departure, it was reported that the CAA sought to expand by several schools, allowing it to split into a divisional format for most of its sports in order to reduce travel costs for its members. Among the schools named as possible candidates were Fairfield University, Howard University, Monmouth University, and the University of North Carolina at Greensboro. In January 2022, reports emerged that Hampton University, a historically black institution that had been working toward a CAA move since at least 1995, would likely join the CAA that July. Monmouth was again named as a potential CAA expansion candidate. Also, Stony Brook University, already a member of CAA Football, was named as a candidate for membership in the all-sports CAA. On January 18, local media in Monmouth's home of New Jersey reported that a CAA invitation to that school was imminent.

The CAA later announced on January 25 that Hampton, Monmouth, and Stony Brook would become members of the all-sports CAA that July, with Hampton and Monmouth joining Stony Brook in CAA Football. On February 22, the CAA announced that North Carolina A&T State University would join the all-sports CAA that July and CAA Football in 2023. Still later, Campbell University was announced as a new member of both sides of the league effective in 2023.

Commissioners

Member schools

Full members

Current full members

Notes

Future full member

Former full members

Notes

Associate members
In all tables below, dates of joining and departure reflect the calendar years these moves took effect. For spring sports, the year of arrival is the calendar year before the first season of competition. For fall sports, the year of departure is the calendar year after the final season of competition.

Current associate members

Notes

Former associate members

Notes

Membership timeline

Sports
The CAA sponsors championship competitions in ten men's and twelve women's NCAA sanctioned sports. Eleven schools are associate members in three sports.

Men's sponsored sports by school 

Men's varsity sports not sponsored by the CAA which are played by CAA schools
Future member in gray.

Notes

Women's sponsored sports by school 

Women's varsity sports not sponsored by the CAA which are played by CAA schools

Notes

In addition to the above, Charleston counts its female cheerleaders (though not its male cheerleaders) and all-female dance team as varsity teams. Neither cheerleading nor dance team competitions are sponsored by the NCAA.

Current champions 

RS = regular-season champion; T = tournament champion

Men's basketball

Regular season champions
Note: The conference was known as the ECAC South from 1979 to 1985.

History of the tournament final

Men's CAA tournament championships and finalists 

‡Former member of the CAA

Broadcasters

Women's basketball

Regular season champions

History of the Tournament finals

Women's CAA tournament championships and finalists

‡Former member of the CAA

Football

The CAA Football Conference was formed in 2005, although it did not begin play until 2007, as a separate conference independent of the CAA, but administered by the CAA front office. For this reason, there are no true "football associate members" as every member of CAA Football is a full-member of the football-only conference. In the 2004–05 academic year, the CAA had five member schools that sponsored football, all of them as football-only members of the Atlantic 10 Conference (A10). In 2005, as previously noted, Northeastern accepted the CAA's offer of membership, giving the CAA the six football-playing members it needed under NCAA rules to organize a football conference. At that time, the CAA announced it would launch its new football conference in 2007. Next, the CAA invited the University of Richmond to become a football-only member effective in 2007. Once UR accepted the offer, this left the A10 football conference with only five members, less than the six required under NCAA rules.  As a result, the remaining A10 football programs all decided to join the CAA on a football-only basis, spelling the end of A10 football, at least under that conference's banner. Since the CAA football conference had the same members as the A10 the previous year, it can be said that the CAA football conference is the A10 football conference under new management.

The CAA football conference's earliest roots are in the New England Conference, founded in 1938 by four state-supported universities in that region plus Northeastern; three of the public schools are currently in the CAA football conference. After the departure of Northeastern in 1945, the remaining members joined New England's other land-grant colleges, Massachusetts State College (now the University of Massachusetts) and the University of Vermont, to form the Yankee Conference under a new charter in 1946, with competition starting in 1947. That conference eventually dropped all sports other than football in 1975.  Starting in the 1980s, it expanded to include many schools outside its original New England base.  After the NCAA voted to limit the influence of single-sport conferences, the Yankee merged with the A10 in 1997. As mentioned above, the A10 football conference effectively became the CAA Football Conference in 2007.

The CAA Football Conference does not claim the legacy of the A10 Football Conference or the Yankee Conference. However, every school that was in the Yankee Conference at the time of the A10 merger and still fields an FCS-level football team (nine out of the final 12 members of the Yankee Conference) is in the CAA football conference.  As further proof of the continuity between conferences, the CAA inherited the A10's automatic bid to the FCS playoffs, which in turn was inherited from the Yankee.

On May 31, 2006, Old Dominion University announced that it would start a football team to begin play in 2009. ODU joined the CAA football conference in 2011. On April 17, 2008, Georgia State University announced that it would start a football team to begin play in 2010 and join the CAA football conference in 2012. The team is playing in the 70,000 seat Georgia Dome, but is restricting ticket sales to just over 28,000 for virtually all its games. However, GSU played only the 2012 season in the CAA, and was not eligible for the conference title, as it began an FBS transition in advance of its 2013 move to the Sun Belt Conference.

Since the CAA began play as a football conference in 2007, a member team has played in the FCS Championship game seven times, with Delaware making it in 2007 and 2010, Richmond in winning in 2008, Villanova winning in 2009, Towson appearing in 2013, and James Madison winning in 2016 and appearing in 2017. In 2007, the CAA set records with 15 national player of the week honorees and by sending five teams to the national championship playoffs. The very next season, in 2008, they broke that record with 19 national player of the week honorees and tied their own record by again sending five teams to the national championship playoffs for the second straight year. At the end of the 2008 season, the CAA had six Top 25 teams with four placing in the Top Ten. Players from the CAA received 78 All-America honors.

In the opening weekend of the 2009 season, CAA teams defeated three Division I FBS teams. William & Mary and Richmond took down teams from the ACC (one of the six conferences whose champions receive automatic Bowl Championship Series berths), respectively Virginia and Duke, while Villanova defeated Temple from the MAC. The following weekend saw New Hampshire defeat another MAC team, Ball State (which had gone through the previous regular season unbeaten, but ended 2009 2–10). All four of the CAA teams to defeat FBS teams qualified for the 2009 FCS playoffs and won their first-round games; Villanova and William & Mary reached the semifinals, and Villanova won the FCS championship.

Northeastern—the school whose 2005 move to the CAA enabled the creation of the CAA football conference—dropped football after the 2009 season. President Joseph E. Aoun and the board of trustees endorsed the move after an extensive, two-year review of the athletic program by its director, Peter Roby. The decision to eliminate football followed six straight losing seasons and sparse game attendance at a school whose ice rink often sells out for hockey.

On December 3, 2009, Hofstra announced that the university would no longer be sponsoring football. The decision follows a two-year review of sports spending at Hofstra. School officials stated there are no plans to cut any other sports at the Long Island school.  Hofstra cited costs and low student interest—only 500 students would attend home games despite free tickets—as reasons to drop the program. Due to the reduction of the conference, the CAA did not use the division format for the 2010 season. Even though Old Dominion began conference play in 2011 and Georgia State did the same in 2012, the divisional format is not likely to return in the immediate future, as the CAA lost football members in both 2012 and 2013. UMass departed for FBS and the Mid-American Conference in 2012 followed by Georgia State's departure for the Sun Belt and Old Dominion for Conference USA.

The 2010 season started with the biggest non-conference win of the CAA's short history, when James Madison defeated nationally ranked Virginia Tech (FBS #13 at the time) of the ACC.  JMU won 21–16 on September 11, at Virginia Tech's Lane Stadium.

Current members

As of the 2022 season, CAA Football has the following members:
Albany
Delaware
Elon
Hampton
Maine
Monmouth
New Hampshire
Richmond
Rhode Island
Stony Brook
Towson
Villanova
William & Mary

Campbell and North Carolina A&T will join CAA Football in 2023.

Former members
Former members of CAA Football are:
 Northeastern: 2007–2009, dropped football.
 Georgia State: 2012, moved to the FBS-level Sun Belt Conference (SBC).
 Hofstra: 2007–2009, dropped football.
 UMass: 2007–2011, moved to the FBS-level Mid-American Conference for football only, now an FBS Independent.
 Old Dominion: 2011–2012, competed as an FCS independent in 2013 before joining Conference USA, an FBS conference, for the sport in 2014. ODU has since moved to the SBC.
 James Madison: 2007–2021, moved to FBS and the SBC in 2022.

Hofstra, James Madison, Northeastern, and UMass each also played in the CAA's predecessor football conferences. UMass joined the Yankee Conference in 1947, James Madison and Northeastern joined the Yankee Conference in 1993, and Hofstra joined the Atlantic 10 Conference in 2001.

Additionally, former members of its ancestor conferences (New England Conference, Yankee Conference, Atlantic 10 Conference) include:
Boston U.: 1971–1997, dropped football.
Northeastern: 1938–1945 (New England Conference)
Holy Cross: 1971, became independent, now in the Patriot League.
UConn: 1938–1999, moved up to Division I-A (now FBS) and joined the Big East Conference for football in 2004. When the original Big East split in 2013, UConn remained with most of the FBS Big East schools in the reorganized American Athletic Conference. In July 2020, UConn joined the current non-football Big East Conference, with football becoming an FBS independent.
Vermont: 1938–1973, dropped football.

Membership timeline

Conference champions

All-time conference championships

Co-championships are designated by italics.

BOLD denotes the team won the National Championship

‡Former member of CAA Football

The CAA's 2020–21 NCAA Division I FCS football season was played in Spring 2021 due to the COVID-19 pandemic. Several teams opted out, and some games were canceled. The Delaware Fightin' Blue Hens completed the season with a 5-0 overall record, 4–0 in conference, and won the North Division title; the James Madison Dukes completed the season with a 5-0 overall record, 3–0 in conference, and won the South Division title. A vote of the CAA athletic directors, not including Delaware or James Madison, was held to determine a champion. The Delaware Fightin' Blue Hens were declared the 2020 CAA football champions as a result of this vote and were awarded the automatic qualifier for the FCS playoffs.

NCAA FCS National Championships by School 

†Delaware was an NCAA FCS Independent in the 1982 season.

*Won as a member of the Atlantic 10 Conference.

^UMass became a football-only member in the MAC in 2013, and an independent football member of FBS beginning with the 2016 season.

All-time NFL Draft selections

Men's soccer

Regular season champions
Note: The conference was known as the ECAC South from 1983 to 1985.

List of CAA regular season champions.

All-time conference championships

Facilities
Future teams in gray.

See also
List of American collegiate athletic stadiums and arenas

References

External links
 

 
Organizations based in Richmond, Virginia
Sports in the Eastern United States
Sports organizations established in 1983
Articles which contain graphical timelines